John W. Brennan Jr. is a United States Army major general who serves as the director of operations of the United States Special Operations Command since October 2022. He most recently served as commander of the Combined Joint Task Force - Operation Inherent Resolve since September 9, 2021 to September 8, 2022. He previously served as the Commanding General of the 1st Special Forces Command (Airborne) from November 2019 to August 2021, and as the Deputy Commander of Joint Special Operations Command.

In March 2023, Brennan was nominated for promotion to lieutenant general.

Awards and decorations

References

Living people
Place of birth missing (living people)
Recipients of the Defense Superior Service Medal
Recipients of the Legion of Merit
United States Army generals
United States Army personnel of the Iraq War
United States Army personnel of the War in Afghanistan (2001–2021)
Year of birth missing (living people)